Highway 784 is a provincial highway in the Canadian province of Saskatchewan. It runs from Highway 29 near Wilkie to Highway 41 near Aberdeen. Highway 784 also passes near Cando, Struan, Dalmeny, and Warman. East of Warman, the road crosses the South Saskatchewan River on the Clarkboro Ferry.

Major intersections 
From west to east:

See also 
Roads in Saskatchewan
Transportation in Saskatchewan

References 

784